Jonathan Tomas Lockwood (born December 12, 1981) is a former professional baseball pitcher. Lockwood participated in the 2008 Summer Olympics, as a member of Canada's baseball team.

Professional baseball career
Lockwood was born in Toronto and attended Humberside Collegiate Institute. He played baseball for Louisiana Tech University and signed with the Seattle Mariners in August 2003. 

In 2004, he pitched for both the AZL Mariners and Everett AquaSox, appearing in 12 games in his first professional season. Lockwood saw time with the AquaSox and the Wisconsin Timber Rattlers in 2005, the Inland Empire 66ers in 2006 and the High Desert Mavericks in 2007 before ending his playing career.

Olympic career
While with the Mariners organization, he joined Canada's national baseball team. In November 2005, he combined with relievers Steve Green and Aaron Myette to no-hit Guatemala in a 2008 Summer Olympics qualifier. By 2008, Lockwood was working as an advertising salesman for the Toronto Sun, but returned to Team Canada for the Olympics. On August 14, he recorded a loss against Cuba.

References

External links
 
 

1981 births
Baseball players from Toronto
Baseball players at the 2008 Summer Olympics
Canadian expatriate baseball players in the United States
Everett AquaSox players
High Desert Mavericks players
Inland Empire 66ers of San Bernardino players
Wisconsin Timber Rattlers players
Living people
Olympic baseball players of Canada